Amurri is an Italian surname which is most prevalent in the eastern coastal region of Marche and is also to be found among the Argentinian and American Italian diaspora. Notable people with the surname include:

 Antonio Amurri (1925–1992), Italian author, radio and television writer and lyricist
 Eva Amurri (born 1985), American film and television actress
 Franco Amurri (born 1958), Italian film director, producer and screenwriter
 Lorenzo Amurri (1971–2016), Italian writer and musician

References

Italian-language surnames